The 2022 Campeonato Paraibano de Futebol was the 112th edition of Paraíba's top professional football league. The competition was scheduled to start on 3 February 2022, although dates beyond the first phase were not initially fixed due to potential clashes with 2022 Copa do Nordeste and 2022 Copa do Brasil.

Campinense were crowned champions, winning their 22nd title after beating Botafogo-PB over two legs in the final.

Format
The competition was divided into a number of stages; a group phase, a repechage, a semi-final, a final and a third-place play-off.

In the group phase, the ten teams were divided into two groups of five, and played the other teams in their group home and away. The teams finishing top in each group qualified directly for the semi-final. The teams finishing bottom of each group were relegated to the second division.

In the repechage, the second placed team in each group played the third placed team in the other group in a single game. The winners of the two matches qualified for the semi-finals.

The semi-final and final were played over two legs, with a penalty shoot-out deciding the tie if results were level after the two legs. The semi-finals paired the winner of each group phase with the winner of the repechage match featuring the third-placed team from the same group. In the final, the team with the best record in the competition to date was designated the home team for the second leg.

The third-place play-off was scheduled to be a single match, with extra time and penalties if required.

Qualification
The two finalists qualified to participate in the 2023 Copa do Brasil, unless they obtain qualification via other means, in which case the place passed to the third-placed team. The champion qualified to participate in the 2023 Copa do Nordeste. The two best placed teams (other than those already participating in a national league) qualified to participate in the 2023 Campeonato Brasileiro Série D.

Participating teams

Group phase

Group A

Group B

Repechage
In the repechage phase, the 2nd placed team in each group played off against the 3rd placed team in the other group, in a single game. The 2nd placed teams had the home advantage.

Semi-final
The semi-final paired the winner of each group phase with the winner of the repechage match featuring the third-placed team from the same group, and was played over two legs, with a penalty shoot-out deciding the tie if results were level. 

|}

First legs

Second legs

Final
The final was played over two legs.

|}

First leg

Second leg

Campinense are champions of 2022 Campeonato Paraibano

Third-place playoff
The third place play-off was scheduled to take place over a single game, with extra time and penalties if required. On 29 April, at the request of both qualified teams, the FPF cancelled the game due to the unnecessary costs, and both teams having already qualified for Série D. Third place was awarded to Sousa.

Sousa awarded third-place

References

Paraíba
2022 in Brazilian football
2022